Tsaghkashen is a village in the Gavar Municipality of the Gegharkunik Province of Armenia.

Etymology 
The village was previously known as Kyarimkend.

History 
The village was founded in 1859. The village church dedicated to St. Hovhannes dates to the 9th-10th century.

Gallery

References

External links 

 
 
 

Populated places in Gegharkunik Province